Zoran Vulić (born 4 October 1961) is a Croatian professional football manager and former player who played as a defender. He is most notable for having managed Hajduk Split five separate times between 1998 and 2018, which is a record among all Hajduk managers.

Playing career

Club
Vulić was born in Split. He is the son of Ante, a famous goalkeeper for Hajduk Split in the 1950s. Zoran Vulić joined Hajduk Split as a stopper with a powerful shot, and played for the club for nine seasons. He played a total of 167 league games and scored 25 goals. He successfully continued his career abroad, with stints at RCD Mallorca and FC Nantes in the following five years. He was instrumental in Mallorca's return to the La Liga during his debut season. He played 35 matches and scored five times.

Vulić returned to Hajduk in 1993 and retired after two years with the club, at age 34. In his first stint with the club, he conquered two Yugoslav Cups in 1984 and 1987, and in his second stint two Croatian Leagues in 1994 and 1995, and one cup in 1995.

International
Vulić won 25 caps for Yugoslavia, scoring once, and participated at the 1990 World Cup in Italy, where he played four of the team's five matches. His national team debut was on 30 April 1986, when Yugoslavia lost 4–2 to Brazil in a friendly match.

He also played in three friendly matches for Croatia: in October 1990  against the United States and in June 1991 against Slovenia, both unofficial since Croatia was still part of Yugoslavia at the time, as well as against Ukraine in June 1993.

International goals
Results list Yugoslavia's and Croatia's goal tallies first.

Managerial career
In 1998, Vulić continued his career as manager, with his first four spells all at Hajduk Split. His biggest success as Hajduk manager was winning the 2000–01 Croatian First League and the 2002–03 Croatian Cup. In 2004, he was sacked three rounds before the end of the 2003–04 Croatian First League season even though the team was sitting at the top of the table, and he was replaced by the new manager, Petar Nadoveza, who ended up winning that championship with Hajduk.

In January 2008, Vulić moved to Russian Premier League club FC Luch-Energiya Vladivostok. He returned to Croatia in 2009, taking over HNK Rijeka. In February 2010, he took charge of Istra 1961. Vulić also managed RNK Split on two occasions. His biggest success with that team was reaching the final of the 2014–15 Croatian Cup where they were beaten on penalties by Dinamo Zagreb. 

In 2015, he took over Sheriff Tiraspol and managed to win the 2015–16 Moldovan National Division. He left the club in June 2016. On 14 December 2016, Vulić was appointed as manager of FC Atyrau. On 11 April 2017, the club announced a mutually agreed contract termination, as Vulić wanted to return to Croatia. He was then manager of Apollon Smyrni from September to December 2017, when he was sacked after a poor run of results. 

His final stint with Hajduk was from 9 September to 27 November 2018, when he was sacked after having won only 3 of the 9 league matches. 

Additionally, Vulić also served as an assistant coach of the Croatia national team.

Managerial statistics

Honours

Player
Hajduk Split
Croatian First League: 1993–94, 1994–95
Croatian Cup: 1994–95
Yugoslav Cup: 1983–84, 1986–87

Manager
Hajduk Split
Croatian First League: 2000–01
Croatian Cup: 2002–03

Sheriff Tiraspol
Moldovan National Division: 2015–16

References

External links
 
 
 
 Croatian national team data

1961 births
Living people
Footballers from Split, Croatia
Association football defenders
Association football utility players
Yugoslav footballers
Yugoslavia international footballers
1990 FIFA World Cup players
Croatian footballers
Croatia international footballers
Dual internationalists (football)
HNK Hajduk Split players
RCD Mallorca players
FC Nantes players
Yugoslav First League players
Croatian Football League players
La Liga players
Segunda División players
Ligue 1 players
Yugoslav expatriate footballers
Expatriate footballers in Spain
Yugoslav expatriate sportspeople in Spain
Croatian expatriate footballers
Expatriate footballers in France
Croatian expatriate sportspeople in France
Croatian football managers
HNK Hajduk Split managers
FC Luch Vladivostok managers
HNK Rijeka managers
NK Istra 1961 managers
RNK Split managers
Croatia national under-19 football team managers
FC Sheriff Tiraspol managers
FC Atyrau managers
Apollon Smyrnis F.C. managers
Xanthi F.C. managers
Croatian Football League managers
Russian Premier League managers
Moldovan Super Liga managers
Croatian expatriate football managers
Expatriate football managers in Russia
Croatian expatriate sportspeople in Russia
Expatriate football managers in Moldova
Croatian expatriate sportspeople in Moldova
Expatriate football managers in Kazakhstan
Croatian expatriate sportspeople in Kazakhstan
Expatriate football managers in Greece
Croatian expatriate sportspeople in Greece